The Festival of the Arts – known locally as simply Festival, typically with the year added (e.g. "Festival 2005") – is a three-day multimedia arts festival, held in Grand Rapids, Michigan on the first Friday, Saturday, and Sunday of June. The event features live performances of music, dance, and other performing arts; displays and sales of paintings and other visual arts; art and sculpture opportunities for children; film/video and literary presentations; and a wide variety of multicultural food booths operated by local non-profit organizations. Typically involving nearly 20,000 community volunteers and over half a million visitors, according to the Library of Congress, Festival is the largest all-volunteer arts festival in the United States.

History 
Festival was first held in 1970, a year after the 1969 installation of Alexander Calder's La Grande Vitesse, featuring two stages and a few food booths. The event grew quickly, filling the Vandenberg Plaza by the 1980s, and subsequently expanding into nearby streets, with several performance stages, and more than two dozen food booths. The public event was suspended in 2020 due to the COVID-19 pandemic, replaced with a virtual event.

References

External links
Festival of the Arts Homepage
MLive's coverage of Festival

Arts festivals in the United States
Festivals in Michigan
Tourist attractions in Grand Rapids, Michigan